The Plagues of Egypt, in the account of the book of Exodus, are ten disasters inflicted on Biblical Egypt by the God of Israel in order to convince the Pharaoh to emancipate the enslaved Israelites, each of them confronting Pharaoh and one of his Egyptian gods; they serve as "signs and marvels" given by God to answer Pharaoh's taunt that he does not know Yahweh: "The Egyptians shall know that I am the ".

Plagues

1. Turning water to blood: Ex. 7:14–24

2. Frogs: Ex. 7:25–8:11/15

3. Lice or gnats: Ex. 8:12–15/8:16–19

4. Wild animals or flies: Ex. 8:16–28/8:20–32 

The fourth plague of Egypt was of creatures capable of harming people and livestock. The Torah emphasizes that the ‘arob (עָרוֹב "mixture" or "swarm") only came against the Egyptians and did not affect the Israelites. Pharaoh asked Moses to remove this plague and promised to grant the Israelites their freedom. However, after the plague was gone, Pharaoh hardened his heart  and he refused to keep his promise.

Various sources use either "wild animals" or "flies".

5. Pestilence of livestock: Ex. 9:1–7

6. Boils: Ex. 9:8-12

7. Thunderstorm of hail and fire: Ex. 9:13–35

8. Locusts: Ex. 10:1–20

9. Three days of darkness: Ex. 10:21–29

10. Death of firstborn son: Ex. 11:1–12:36  

Before this final plague, God commands Moses to tell the Israelites to mark a lamb's blood above their doors in order that the Angel of Death will pass over them (i.e., that they will not be touched by the death of the firstborn). Pharaoh orders the Israelites to leave, taking whatever they want, and asks Moses to bless him in the name of the Lord. The passage goes on to state that the passover sacrifice recalls the time when the  "passed over the houses of the Israelites in Egypt".

Composition and theology 

Scholars are in broad agreement that the publication of the Torah took place in the mid-Persian period (the 5th century BCE). The Book of Deuteronomy, composed in stages between the 7th and 6th centuries, mentions the "diseases of Egypt" (Deuteronomy 7:15 and 28:60) but refers to something that afflicted the Israelites, not the Egyptians, and never specifies the plagues.

The traditional number of ten plagues is not actually mentioned in Exodus, and other sources differ; Psalms 78 and 105 seem to list only seven or eight plagues and order them differently. It appears that originally there were only seven, to which were added the third, sixth, and ninth, bringing the count to ten.

In this final version, the first nine plagues form three triads, each of which God introduces by informing Moses of the main lesson it will teach. In the first triad, the Egyptians begin to experience the power of God; in the second, God demonstrates that he is directing events; and in the third, the incomparability of Yahweh is displayed. Overall, the plagues are "signs and marvels" given by the God of Israel to answer Pharaoh's taunt that he does not know Yahweh: "The Egyptians shall know that I am the ".

Historicity 

Scholars broadly agree that the Exodus is not a historical account, that the Israelites originated in Canaan and from the Canaanites and that, while a small group of proto-Israelites probably did originate from Egypt, it did not happen in the massive way the Bible describes. The Ipuwer Papyrus, written probably in the late Twelfth Dynasty of Egypt (c. 1991–1803 BCE), has been put forward in popular literature as confirmation of the biblical account, most notably because of its statement that "the river is blood" and its frequent references to servants running away; however, these arguments ignore the many points on which Ipuwer contradicts Exodus, such as Asiatics arriving in Egypt rather than leaving and the fact that the "river is blood" phrase probably refers to the red sediment colouring the Nile during disastrous floods, or is simply a poetic image of turmoil. Attempts to find natural explanations for the plagues (e.g., a volcanic eruption to explain the "darkness" plague) have been dismissed by biblical scholars on the grounds that their pattern, timing, rapid succession, and above all, control by Moses mark them as supernatural.

Artistic representation

Visual art

In visual art, the plagues have generally been reserved for works in series, especially engravings. Still, relatively few depictions in art emerged compared to other religious themes until the 19th century, when the plagues became more common subjects, with John Martin and Joseph Turner producing notable canvases. This trend probably reflected a Romantic attraction to landscape and nature painting, for which the plagues were suited, a Gothic attraction to morbid stories, and a rise in Orientalism, wherein exotic Egyptian themes found currency. Given the importance of noble patronage throughout Western art history, the plagues may have found consistent disfavor because the stories emphasize the limits of a monarch's power, and images of lice, locusts, darkness, and boils were ill-suited for decoration in palaces and churches.

Music
Perhaps the most successful artistic representation of the plagues is Handel's oratorio Israel in Egypt, which, like his perennial favorite, "Messiah", takes a libretto entirely from scripture. The work was especially popular in the 19th century because of its numerous choruses, generally one for each plague, and its playful musical depiction of the plagues. For example, the plague of frogs is performed as a light aria for alto, depicting frogs jumping in the violins, and the plague of flies and lice is a light chorus with fast scurrying runs in the violins.

Documentaries
 The Exodus Decoded (2006)

Films
 The Ten Commandments (1923)
 The Moon of Israel (1924)
 The Ten Commandments (1956)
 The Abominable Dr. Phibes (1971)
 The Seventh Sign (1988)
 Moses (1995)
 The Prince of Egypt (1998)
 Magnolia (1999)
 The Mummy (1999)
 The Reaping (2007)
 Exodus: Gods and Kings (2014)
 Seder-Masochism (2018)

Image gallery

See also 
 Aaron's rod
 Jochebed
 Miriam

References

Further reading

External links 
 

Book of Exodus
Egypt in the Hebrew Bible
Moses
Passover
Jewish miracles
Animals in religion
Insects in religion
Disasters in Egypt